Seine River is a provincial electoral division in the Canadian province of Manitoba. It was created by redistribution in 1989, and has formally existed since the 1990 provincial election. The constituency is located in the southern section of the City of Winnipeg.

Seine River is bordered to the south and east by the rural riding of Dawson Trail, to the north by Southdale and Riel, and to the west by St. Norbert. The riding is mostly urban, although it also includes some rural space.

The riding's population in 1996 was 18,833. In 1999, the average family income was $63,800, and the unemployment rate was 4.20%. Seine River's francophone population is 9%, and there is also a significant German community (4%). Health and social services account for 14% of the riding's industry.

List of provincial representatives
This riding has elected the following MLAs:

Electoral results

 
|Progressive Conservative
|Louise Dacquay
| style="text-align:right;" |3,582
| style="text-align:right;" |42.40
| style="text-align:right;" |-5.38
| style="text-align:right;" |$16,327.06

Previous boundaries

References

Seine River
Politics of Winnipeg